B717 may refer to:

 The Boeing 717 airliner
 The B717 road in Scotland